Sol is a 2014 Canadian documentary film by Marie-Hélène Cousineau and Susan Avingaq about Solomon Uyarasuk, a musician/circus performer who died in police custody in Igloolik, Nunavut. The film questions the claims by the local Royal Canadian Mounted Police detachment that Uyarasuk hanged himself in his cell, and also explores the wider issue of Nunavut's very high suicide rate.

The film played  at the 2014 imagineNATIVE Film + Media Arts Festival in Toronto.

The film subsequently won the Grand Prize for Best Canadian Feature at the RIDM Montreal International Documentary Festival and was included in the list of Canada's Top Ten feature films of 2014, selected by a panel of filmmakers and industry professionals organized by TIFF.

On March 8, 2016, it was named Best Documentary Program at the 4th Canadian Screen Awards.

References

External links

2014 films
2014 documentary films
Films shot in Nunavut
Inuktitut-language films
Documentary films about suicide
Documentary films about indigenous rights
Canadian documentary films
Suicide in Canada
Deaths in police custody in Canada
Documentary films about Inuit in Canada
2010s Canadian films
Films set in Nunavut